Madhavapuram is a village in the Kumbakonam taluk of Thanjavur district, Tamil Nadu, India.

Demographics 

As per the 2001 census, Madhavapuram had a total population of 138 with 67 males and 71 females. The literacy rate was 83%.

References 

 

Villages in Thanjavur district